Music by Cavelight is the first solo studio album by American hip hop producer Blockhead. It was released on Ninja Tune on March 23, 2004. It peaked at number 43 on the UK Independent Albums Chart. It received generally favorable reviews from critics.

Release
Music by Cavelight came about when Mush Records, for whom Blockhead had already produced a breakbeat album, asked him to produce an album. After Mush Records stopped returning his phone calls, he and his manager sent the demos around other labels before Ninja Tune, having received a copy through Warp Records, offered to release the album.

Critical reception

At Metacritic, which assigns a weighted average score out of 100 to reviews from mainstream critics, the album received an average score of 72, based on 10 reviews, indicating "generally favorable reviews".

John Bush of AllMusic wrote, "These tracks are much smoother than the warped jams that fans of his hip-hop work know him for; most of the instrument sources on these tracks are not only recognizable, but hardly tampered with at all." Rollie Pemberton of Pitchfork stated that "All around, Blockhead's first foray into solo sound collage is far from bad, but it rarely steals the show the way his rapper-associated work tends to."

Track listing

Personnel
Credits adapted from the original UK edition CD liner notes.

 Blockhead – production, executive production
 Damien Paris – guitar (2, 5, 10), bass guitar (9)
 Omega One – turntables (2, 3, 10, 11)
 Baby Dayliner – violin (11), recording, mixing, executive production
 Voda – mastering
 Gabe Hilfer – executive production
 Maya Hayuk – photography, design

Charts

References

External links
 

2004 debut albums
Blockhead (music producer) albums
Ninja Tune albums